Tsaghkashat or Gyshlag is a village de facto in the Askeran Province of the breakaway Republic of Artsakh, de jure in the Khojaly District of Azerbaijan, in the disputed region of Nagorno-Karabakh.

Toponymy 
The village is also known as Keshish Kand and Kishlagkend.

History 
During the Soviet period, the village was a part of the Askeran District of the Nagorno-Karabakh Autonomous Oblast.

Historical heritage sites 
Historical heritage sites in and around the village include tombs from the 2nd–1st millennia BCE and the Early Middle Ages, the 12th/13th-century village of Vaka, a 12th/13th-century khachkar, the nearby medieval village of Shinategh, a chapel from the Middle Ages 1 km to the south, the 18th-century religious site of Gharabek 2 km to the south, an 18th-century cemetery, the 19th-century church of Surb Astvatsatsin, and the Nikol Duman House Museum displaying 19th/20th-century life in the village.

Economy and culture 
The population is mainly engaged in agriculture and animal husbandry. As of 2015, the village has a municipal building, a house of culture, a secondary school and a medical centre.

Demographics 
The village has an ethnic Armenian-majority population, had 200 inhabitants in 2005, and 172 inhabitants in 2015.

Notable people 
 Nikol Duman (12 January 1867 – 23 September 1914)

Gallery

References

External links 

 
 

Populated places in Askeran Province
Populated places in Khojaly District